The Dennis Osadebay University, Asaba is a Public University in Asaba, Delta State, Nigeria.

Dennis Osadebay University, Asaba is one of the three new universities established by the Delta State government and approved by the National Universities Commission (NUC) in 2021. This University offers Undergraduate courses and currently comprises six faculties: Agriculture, Science, Management and Social Sciences, Environmental Science, Arts and Computing. The Vice Chancellor of Dennis Osadebay University is Prof Ben Emukufia Akpoyomare Oghojafor.

History

The Dennis Osadebey University, Asaba was formerly Delta State University, Anwai Campus until it was converted to a full university by the  Delta State Government.

In January 2021, Governor Ifeanyi A Okowa of Delta State announced plans to convert Delta State University, Anwai Campus Asaba and two other schools such as Delta State Polytechnic, Ozoro and College of Education, Agbor into a full-fledged University. The bills had their first reading during plenary at the Delta State House of Assembly on the 28th day of January 2021. In February 2021, the bills were passed into law after going through the House Committee on Education.

While signing the bill which was passed by the State House of Assembly, Governor Ifeanyi A Okowa said, "As the students of our technical education start to progress from the technical colleges to the polytechnics, they also have a chance of going further to the University of Science and Technology."

Faculties 

 Faculty of Arts
 Faculty of Sciences
 Faculty of Agriculture
 Faculty of Environmental Sciences
 Faculty of Computing
 Faculty of Management and Social Sciences

See also 

 List of universities in Nigeria
 List of Tertiary Institutions in Delta State
 Delta State University, Abraka
 Delta State University of Science and Technology, Ozoro
 University of Delta, Agbor
 University of Benin (Nigeria)

References 

Public universities in Nigeria
Universities and colleges in Nigeria
Education in Delta State

External links 

 Dennis Osadebay University - official site.